The Western Nilotic languages are one of the three primary branches of the Nilotic languages, along with the Eastern Nilotic languages and Southern Nilotic languages; Themselves belonging to the Eastern Sudanic subfamily of Nilo-Saharan. The about 22 (SIL estimate) Western Nilotic languages are spoken in an area ranging from southwestern Ethiopia and South Sudan via northeastern Democratic Republic of the Congo and northern Uganda to southwestern Kenya (with one of the Luo languages extending into northern Tanzania).

Families 
The Western Nilotic languages are Nilotic languages, which themselves are part of the Kir–Abbaian and Eastern Sudan subfamilies of the much larger Nilo-Saharan language family.

Subdivisions 
Western Nilotic is divided into two main clusters: Dinka–Nuer and Luo. The Luo Languages are languages spoken by the Luo peoples. They include but are not fully limited to, Shilluk, Luwo, Thuri, Belanda Bor, Burun, Päri, Anuak, and Southern Luo. Although mostly being considered a Western Nilotic language and part of the Luo language group, the Burun languages are thought by linguist Roger Blench as a fourth subgroup of Nilotic. The Dinka-Nuer Languages are the larger of the two subgroups and are spoken primarily in South Sudan. These languages include the Dinka language, Nuer, and Atuot. It is also popular belief of linguists that Burun is a third subgroup of Western Nilotic.

Dinka–Nuer (Nuer–Reel (Atuot), Dinka or Thuongjang)
Luo (Shilluk, Luwo (Jur), Thuri, Belanda Bor, Burun (Northern and Southern), Päri, Anuak, Southern Luo)

See also 
 Eastern Nilotic languages
 Southern Nilotic languages
 Luo languages
 Nilotic languages

References

 
Nilotic languages
Nilo-Saharan languages